Rogen Nature Reserve is a nature reserve in Jämtland County in Sweden. It is part of the EU-wide Natura 2000-network.

The nature reserve is centred on Lake Rogen and is part of a wider network of nature protection areas that extend also on the other side of the border with Norway. The landscape is distinctly characterised by Rogen moraine, a type of moraine named after the area. It consists of long, sinuous low hills interspersed with long lakes. In addition, large erratic boulders are spread over the land. The landscape was formed during the last Ice age, and has been described as "labyrinthine".

Fauna
The nature reserve has a rich fauna. European otter, Eurasian lynx, brown bear and wolverine all inhabit the nature reserve. Birds such as golden eagle, black-throated loon, rough-legged buzzard and osprey have all been seen here. The waters of the many lakes are furthermore rich in fish (fishing licenses can be acquired by visitors); species found here include brown trout, burbot, grayling, charr, perch and northern pike. The nature reserve contains Sweden's entire population of wild muskoxen. This small herd (in 2010 it totalled seven animals) traces its origins to animals which were introduced to Norway from Greenland in the mid-20th century. In 1971, some of these animals crossed the border into Sweden. Visitors are only allowed to approach the animals to within .
The nature reserve is also used as grazing ground for reindeer.

Flora
The flora is less diverse; the barren land is dominated by species such as Scots pine, cowberry, bilberry and wolf lichen.

Historical sites
Within the nature reserve, there are several remains from earlier human activity. These include pits for trapping reindeer of unknown age as well as settlements and graves dating from the Stone Age.

References

Nature reserves in Sweden
Natura 2000 in Sweden
Tourist attractions in Jämtland County
Geography of Jämtland County
Protected areas established in 1976
1976 establishments in Sweden